Gazzetta TV was an Italian terrestrial television channel owned by RCS MediaGroup, specialized in sports broadcastings edited of the editorial staff of the La Gazzetta dello Sport, Italian sports newspaper.

Launched on 26 February 2015, it forwarded all the matches of the Copa América 2015 live exclusively in Italy.

The channel closed on Jan. 6, 2016 due to financial problems.

Programming
Gazzetta News
Copa América 2015
2018 FIFA World Cup qualification (CONMEBOL)
Football League Championship
Football League Cup
2015 Trophée des Champions
Campeonato Brasileiro Série A
Barça TV
CEV Women's Champions League
2015 FIVB Volleyball World Grand Prix
Serie A1 Women (Volley)
Serie A Basket

See also
 Television in Italy
 Digital terrestrial television in Italy
 La Gazzetta dello Sport
 RCS MediaGroup

References

External links
Official Website 

Defunct television channels in Italy
Sports television in Italy
Italian-language television stations
Television channels and stations established in 2015
Television channels and stations disestablished in 2016
2015 establishments in Italy
2016 disestablishments in Italy